Vulcan Hills is a group of small volcanic hills about 4 nautical miles (7 km) southwest of Shulte Hills in the Southern Cross Mountains of Victoria Land. Named by the southern party of New Zealand Geological Survey Antarctic Expedition (NZGSAE), 1966–67, in recognition of the volcanic composition of the rocks which form these hills.

Hills of Victoria Land
Borchgrevink Coast